Wallowbarrow Crag is a hill of  in the Lake District, England. It is on the west of the Duddon Valley, across the valley from the village of Seathwaite.

Wallowbarrow Crag is a Fellranger, being included in Mark Richards'  The Old Man of Coniston, Swirl How, Wetherlam and the South as one of the 18 (now 21) of his 227 (230 with the extension of the national park) summits which are not in Alfred Wainwright's list of 214. It is also classified as a Tump. It is a recognised site for rock climbing.

References

Fells of the Lake District